What Could Possibly Go Wrong(?) may refer to:

 What Could Possibly Go Wrong (album), by Dominic Fike, 2020
 What Could Possibly Go Wrong? (book), a 2012 non-fiction novel by Tony Bleetman
 "What Could Possibly Go Wrong", a 1993 TV pilot centred around the fictional character Bubsy